The New Lawn is a historic building located in Des Moines, Iowa, United States.  This three-story, brick structure was completed in 1915.  It features seven units, an U-shaped plan, a symmetrical facade with projecting wings, polychrome brick veneer, a series of quadruple ribbon windows, and a flat roof.  The building is located on Sixth Avenue, which by the turn of the 20th century had become a major route utilized by vehicular traffic and streetcar lines.  Its proximity to this transportation corridor illustrates the emergence of higher and denser residential use in this area of Des Moines.  The apartment building was listed on the National Register of Historic Places in 1996.

References

Residential buildings completed in 1915
Apartment buildings in Des Moines, Iowa
National Register of Historic Places in Des Moines, Iowa
Apartment buildings on the National Register of Historic Places in Iowa
Prairie School architecture in Iowa